Khanpur J. Aurangabad is a village in Powayan tehsil in Shahjahanpur district of Uttar Pradesh.

Nearby Villages

Population
Khanpur J. Aurangabad's population is 203. Out of this, 119 are males while the females count 84 here. This village has 49 kids in the age group of 0-6 years. Out of this 32 are boys and 17 are girls

References 

Villages in Shahjahanpur district